Cosmosoma is a genus of tiger moths in the subfamily Arctiinae. The genus was erected by Jacob Hübner in 1823.

Species

Cosmosoma achemon (Fabricius, 1781)
Cosmosoma achemonides Dognin, 1907
Cosmosoma admota (Herrich-Schäffer, [1854])
Cosmosoma advena Druce, 1884
Cosmosoma annexa (Herrich-Schäffer, [1854])
Cosmosoma auge (Linnaeus, 1767)
Cosmosoma aurifera (Klages, 1906)
Cosmosoma batesii (Butler, 1876)
Cosmosoma beata (Butler, 1876)
Cosmosoma beatrix (Druce, 1884)
Cosmosoma biseriatum Schaus, 1898
Cosmosoma bogotensis (Felder, 1874)
Cosmosoma bolivari Schaus, 1898
Cosmosoma braconoides (Walker, 1854)
Cosmosoma bromus (Cramer, [1775])
Cosmosoma caecum Hampson, 1898
Cosmosoma centralis (Walker, 1854)
Cosmosoma cincta (Schaus, 1894)
Cosmosoma consolata (Walker, 1856)
Cosmosoma contracta (Walker, 1856)
Cosmosoma demantria Druce, 1895
Cosmosoma determinata (Butler, 1876)
Cosmosoma dorsimacula Schaus, 1898
Cosmosoma durca Schaus, 1896
Cosmosoma elegans Butler, 1876
Cosmosoma ethodaea Druce, 1889
Cosmosoma eumelis (Druce, 1883)
Cosmosoma evadnes (Stoll, [1781])
Cosmosoma fenestrata (Drury, [1773])
Cosmosoma festivum (Walker, 1854)
Cosmosoma flavicornis (Druce, 1883)
Cosmosoma flavitarsis (Walker, 1854)
Cosmosoma galatea Schaus, 1912
Cosmosoma gaza (Schaus, 1892)
Cosmosoma gemmata (Butler, 1876)
Cosmosoma hector Staudinger, 1876
Cosmosoma hercyna (Druce, 1884)
Cosmosoma hypocheilus Hampson, 1898
Cosmosoma ignidorsia Hampson, 1898
Cosmosoma impar (Walker, 1854)
Cosmosoma intensa (Walker, 1854)
Cosmosoma joavana Schaus, 1924
Cosmosoma juanita Neumoegen, 1894
Cosmosoma ladan (Druce, 1896)
Cosmosoma leuconoton Hampson, 1898
Cosmosoma lycopolis (Druce, 1883)
Cosmosoma melanopera Hampson, 1898
Cosmosoma metallescens (Ménétriés, 1857)
Cosmosoma myrodora Dyar, 1907 – scarlet-bodied wasp moth
Cosmosoma nelea Möschler, 1878
Cosmosoma nigricornis (Fabricius, 1787)
Cosmosoma oratha (Druce, 1893)
Cosmosoma orathidia Druce, 1898
Cosmosoma pheres (Stoll, [1782])
Cosmosoma plutona Schaus, 1894
Cosmosoma protus Druce, 1894
Cosmosoma pudica Druce, 1894
Cosmosoma quinquepuncta (Heylaerts, 1890)
Cosmosoma regia (Schaus, 1894)
Cosmosoma remota (Walker, 1854)
Cosmosoma ruatana (Druce, 1888)
Cosmosoma salvini (Butler, 1876)
Cosmosoma saron Druce, 1884
Cosmosoma scita (Walker, 1856)
Cosmosoma sectinota Hampson, 1898
Cosmosoma semifulva (Druce, 1884)
Cosmosoma sephela (Druce, 1883)
Cosmosoma seraphina (Herrich-Schäffer, 1854)
Cosmosoma stibosticta (Butler, 1876)
Cosmosoma stryma (Druce, 1884)
Cosmosoma subflamma (Walker, 1854)
Cosmosoma tarapotensis (Druce, 1897)
Cosmosoma telephus (Walker, 1854)
Cosmosoma tengyra (Walker, 1854)
Cosmosoma teuthras (Walker, 1854)
Cosmosoma tigris Schaus, 1894
Cosmosoma vesparia (Perty, 1834)
Cosmosoma xanthistis Hampson, 1898
Cosmosoma xanthocera Hampson, 1898
Cosmosoma xanthostictum Hampson, 1898
Cosmosoma zurcheri Druce, 1894

References

Lafontaine, J. D. & Schmidt, B. C. (2010). "Annotated check list of the Noctuoidea (Insecta, Lepidoptera) of North America north of Mexico". ZooKeys, 40: 1-239. 

 
Euchromiina
Moth genera